Tina Marie Harmon (June 9, 1969 – October 29, 1981) was a 12-year-old American girl who was abducted, raped, and murdered on October 29, 1981 after being dropped off in Lodi, Ohio. After the discovery of her body, she was later buried at the Maple Mound Cemetery. Two men were originally convicted of her murder on circumstantial evidence but were eventually released when the conviction was overturned. Harmon's murder was solved in 2010 when DNA from the individual who raped her was matched to Robert Anthony Buell.

Case history

Tina Harmon was reportedly last seen with a man in his twenties after she had been dropped off by her father's girlfriend in Lodi, Ohio. Harmon's body was later found next to an oil well site in Navarre, Ohio, five days after her abduction. Nutmeg-colored carpet fibers and dog hair were found on her clothing.

In 1982, Ernest Holbrook, Jr. and Herman Ray Rucker were convicted of both the rape and murder of Harmon, but after complications with the witnesses' testimonies, one of them recanted. Rucker was given a new trial and was released in 1983.

Robert Anthony Buell

In 1984, Robert Anthony Buell was convicted of the 1982 murder of Krista Lea Harrison. The dog hairs on Harmon's body were matched to the ones found on a dog buried in Buell's yard, once DNA testing became possible. Buell was later matched to Harmon's murder by comparing his DNA samples with the ones found on Harmon's clothing several years later. In 2009, when the Harmon case was reopened, it was stated Buell's profile was obtained, but they did not have Tina's.

The nutmeg-colored carpet fibers that were found on the bodies of both Harmon and Harrison matched as well. However, Buell was never tried for Harmon's murder because he was already on death row. In 2002, at the age of 62, Buell was executed for the murder of Harrison.

Cleveland Scene journalist James Renner wrote about similar characteristics of the murders of Harmon, Harrison, and Debora Kaye Smith to the 1989 murder of Amy Mihaljevic, the latter two are currently unsolved. Although Buell was incarcerated at the time of Mihaljevic's death, he stated Buell's nephew Ralph Ross Jr. might be responsible and stated he could have been involved in the three preceding murders, if not the sole perpetrator. In 2008, the evidence in Harmon's case was compared to that in the Mihaljevic case. 

Ross was eliminated as the source of DNA from the Harmon case in 2010.

See also
List of solved missing person cases
Murder of Krista Harrison
Robert Anthony Buell

References

External links

1980s missing person cases
1981 in Ohio
1981 murders in the United States
Deaths by person in Ohio
Deaths by strangulation in the United States
Female murder victims
Formerly missing people
Incidents of violence against girls
Kidnappings in the United States
Medina County, Ohio
Murdered American children
Missing person cases in Ohio
Murder in Ohio
October 1981 events in the United States
October 1981 crimes
Rapes in the United States
Victims of serial killers